Aathmaarpanam is a 1956 Indian Malayalam-language film, directed by G. R. Rao. The film stars Prem Nazir and B. S. Saroja. The film had musical score by V. Dakshinamoorthy. The popular song "Kunkuma Chaaraninju" is from this movie.

Cast
 Prem Nazir
 B. S. Saroja
 Thikkurissy Sukumaran Nair
 T. S. Muthaiah
 Ali Khan
 Bahadoor
 Damodaran
 Husain Khan
 Kottarakkara Sreedharan Nair
 Kuttan Pillai
 Masood
 Muttathara Soman
 N. R. Thankam
 S. P. Pillai
 S. S. Anandan
 Sreedharan
 Vijayam

References

External links

1956 films
1950s Malayalam-language films